Cuber is a small settlement in Slovenia.

Cuber may also refer to:
 Someone who solves the Rubik's Cube puzzle
 Ronnie Cuber (1941–2022), jazz saxophonist
 Cúber, a reservoir on Mallorca, Spain